A four-day workweek is an arrangement where a workplace or place of education has its employees or students work or attend school, college or university over the course of four days per week rather than the more customary five. This arrangement can be a part of flexible working hours, and is sometimes used to cut costs.

The four-day week movement has grown considerably in recent years, with increasing numbers of businesses and organisations around the world trialling and moving permanently to a four-day working week of around 32 hours, with no less pay for workers. Most of these businesses and organisations have found that a four-day week is a win-win for employees and employers, as trials have indicated that it leads to a better work-life balance, lower stress-levels, and increased productivity. An overwhelming majority of studies report that a four-day week leads to increased productivity and decreased stress.

Background 
The five-day workweek is a cultural norm; the result of early 1900s union advocacy to reduce the six-day workweek, which led to the invention of the weekend. In the early 20th century, when the average work week in developed nations was reduced from around 60 to 40 hours, it was expected that further decreases would occur over time. In 1930, economist John Maynard Keynes estimated that technological change and productivity improvements would make a 15-hour work week possible within a couple of generations. Other notable people throughout history to predict continuing reductions in working hours include United States (US) Founding Father Benjamin Franklin, Karl Marx, British philosopher John Stuart Mill, and playwright George Bernard Shaw. In 1956, then US Vice President Richard Nixon promised Americans they would only have to work four days “in the not too distant future”.

Variations
Most advocates for a four-day working week argue for a fixed work schedule, resulting in shorter weeks (e.g. four 8-hour workdays for a total of 32 hours). This follows the 100-80-100 model: 100% pay for 80% of the time, in exchange for a commitment to maintain at least 100% productivity. However, some companies have introduced a four-day week based on a compressed work schedule: in the so-called “4/10 work week,” the widely-used 40 weekly work hours are distributed across four days instead of five, resulting in 10 hour-long workdays (hence “four-ten”).

The resulting schedule may look different depending on the way the four-day week is implemented: in some variants Friday becomes the permanent non-working day, giving employees three consecutive days off over the weekend; some workplaces split the day off among the staff, with half taking Monday off and the other half taking Friday off; sometimes the day off is added in the middle of the week such as a Wednesday, allowing for a mid-week break; and, in some cases the day off changes from week to week, depending on the company’s current goals and workload.

Although it’s not an actual implementation of the four-day week, some companies encourage their employees to spend a portion of the paid time on work-related experiments or personal projects. Google’s “80/20 formula”—referring to the percentage of time spent on core and side projects, respectively—is an example of such policy.

Rationale
The push towards implementing the four-day week has remained loosely relevant within the contemporary workplace due to the various possible benefits it may yield. Although mostly untested, these benefits mainly lie within increased cost-cutting, productivity, and work-life balance. The theory behind this is, employees or students who work or attend school one less day a week will have additional time to pursue hobbies, spend time with family, get more sleep, and increase overall morale.

Consequently, these employees or students will be more productive and refreshed for working or learning, which will make up for the lost day where they would otherwise be overworked and/or overtired. In addition, by having the workplace or school open one less day a week, the operating costs and environmental costs will decrease for businesses and society alike.

Where four-day weeks have been instituted so far, workers gain a better work-life balance that enables them to live happier and more fulfilled lives, and employers are able to recruit and retain high-quality and well-rested workers who deliver greater productivity and creativity.

More broadly, a four-day week provides opportunities to rebalance employment, decreasing the number of people who are overworked and the number who are unemployed or underemployed. It allows for greater gender equality through a more equal share of paid and unpaid work, too, including the caring roles that disproportionately fall on women, and better health and wellbeing for workers and their loved ones.

On top of that, evidence shows that cutting working hours isn’t only good for people: it’s good for the planet. It lowers energy use, meaning less pollution and an opportunity for us to live more sustainably and tackle the climate crisis.

An increase in remote work during the COVID-19 pandemic led to an increase in the desire for flexible work arrangements.

Active trials 

In 2022, not-for-profit advocacy group 4 Day Week Global launched a series of six-month trials for companies in:

 Ireland (17 companies, February to August);
 the United States and Canada (38 companies, April to October);
 the United Kingdom (UK) (61 companies with around 2,900 employees, June to December). The programme, which allows employees to get 100% compensation for working 80% of their usual hours, is being used by more than 61 businesses with around 2,900 employees. Participating businesses include local fish and chip shops, charities, and office-based software developers and employment agencies. The study is being conducted by Autonomy, a think tank, researchers from Cambridge and Oxford universities, and 4 Day Week, an organisation that advocates for a reduced workweek. The project will be overseen by academics from Boston College in the US, Oxford, and Cambridge universities, together with the think tank Autonomy. The pilot has been viewed as a success with many of the programs retaining the four day work week after the pilot program was originally scheduled to end.
 and
 Australia and New Zealand (20 companies, August to February 2023).

Employees of participating companies will work one less day a week with no reduction in pay. The UK pilot is the world's largest trial of a four-day week to date.

Since the COVID-19 pandemic, several governments have proposed and launched four-day working week trials:

 Scotland announced it is putting £10 million towards a trial, as part of its promise to pursue a wellbeing economy.
 Spain announced a voluntary, nationwide, three-year trial of a 32-hour workweek.
 The Japanese government's 2021 annual economic policy guidelines recommended that companies allow their workers to opt for a four day work week, as part of an initiative aimed at improving work-life balance in the country.
 Belgium allowed employees the ability to request a four-day work week through the compression of their 38-hour week.

Prime Ministers Jacinda Ardern of New Zealand and Sanna Marin of Finland have each proposed a four-day workweek as a consideration.

Major trial results

Iceland

Two trials in Iceland between 2015 and 2019 in which working hours were reduced to 35 hours a week without pay reduction for 2,500 workers resulted in "dramatically increased" well-being, and improved work-life balance and stress ratings from employees, measured by a range of indicators such as burnout and perceived stress. Productivity also remained the same, or improved across the majority of all the workplaces, according to UK think tank Autonomy and the Icelandic Association for Sustainable Democracy. While framed as a "four-day week", the trial was for reduced working hours, not necessarily compressed within four days, from 40 to 35 and 36 hours. The study ran two large-scale trials and included more than 1% of Icelands entire population. The vast majority of the workplaces removed up to three hours from the week, not eight, as would be needed in a four-day week. Agreements to reduce work hours following the trial have led to a reduction of an hour or less. Due to that the study was perceived to be an "overwhelming success" 86% of the population that engage in wage labour later on got a permanent reduction of the time they have to spend at work through negotiations.

Perpetual Guardian in New Zealand
In New Zealand, trust company Perpetual Guardian announced in February 2018 that it would begin trialing a four-day work week in March 2018. The six-week trial, initiated by founder Andrew Barnes, saw the company's 240-plus staff nominating a day off each week whilst still receiving full pay. The trial, held in March and April 2018, attracted international media attention. In late March 2018, Barnes noted that the trial was going well with staff reporting more time for their families, hobbies, completing their to-do lists and doing home maintenance.

The trial, which was tracked and assessed by the University of Auckland Business School and Auckland University of Technology, was described as a success  and "a total win-win". Perpetual Guardian then extended the four-day work week scheme permanently. The trial saw increased productivity, customer engagement levels, and staff engagement; reduced staff stress levels; and improved work–life balance. The company's revenue remained stable while costs went down, due to less power being used throughout the period.

The trial sparked publicity both in New Zealand and internationally. New Zealand workplace relations minister Iain Lees-Galloway said the trial was "fascinating".

The initiative was held up by  Barnes as a way of helping to close the gender pay gap and increase diversity in the workforce. Barnes also held the scheme up as a potential blueprint for the workplace of the future, ensuring companies were attractive to millennials and easing Auckland's traffic congestion.

However, while four-day work weeks were deemed a success for most, not everyone involved within the Perpetual Guardian trial was able to adapt, with some reporting feeling increased pressure to complete work within a shorter time frame, particularly around deadlines.

Microsoft Japan

Microsoft Japan conducted a trial four-day work week in summer 2019, granting workers paid leave on Fridays. At the same time it cut the length of most meetings from a full hour to half an hour, and capped attendance at five employees. For the duration of the trial, the company reported a 23% reduction in electricity costs. Sales per employee increased 40% during the last year's same period.

United Kingdom
As of July 2022, more than 80 UK companies and organisations are recognised as having permanently implemented a four-day working week of fewer than 35 hours, with most doing fewer than 32 hours. These include: the consultancy Think Productive, which has been doing a four-day week since 2011; Plymouth-based Portcullis Legals, which has highlighted improvement with productivity and stress levels among staff, whilst providing higher levels of satisfaction amongst its clients; Cornwall-based accountancy firm Whyfield; Bristol and Devon-based Barefoot Architects; gaming studio Big Potato Games; Atom Bank, Leeds-based recruitment agency Charlton Morris; Suffolk-based manufacturing company CMG Technologies, which has been doing a four-day week since 2015; Dorset-based Gungho Marketing; Southampton-based engineering firm Highfield Professional Solutions; and, Edinburgh-based Vault City Brewing.

Of the 73 enterprises in the study, 41 firms answered to a survey midway through the plan. Nearly 86% of those polled stated they would continue to follow the four-day workweek guideline when the experiment is over. According to 4 Day Week, employees experienced decreased childcare and commute expenditures, which resulted in an average annual savings of £3,232.40, or around £269.36 per month, for a parent with two kids. As 50% of workers claim improved productivity during the period, the Manufacturing Technology Centre (MTC) announces it will permanently provide a four-day workweek to its 820 employees (although with 36 hours instead of 48). According to Loughborough University, which undertook an external study, the staff's reaction was "overwhelmingly favourable," and for more recent hires, the policies were one of the primary draws. According to survey results, maintaining a "work-life balance" was important to respondents. However, some companies in the scheme found the move to reduced hours "trickier".

A first for a UK local body, South Cambridgeshire District Council (SCDC) opted to proceed with the experiment of a four-day workweek (30-hour workweek) for roughly 470 desk-based employees. Staff will receive the same full-time compensation during the trial, which will last three months starting in January 2023. The decision, according to council leader Bridget Smith, will improve employee welfare. Joe Ryle, director of the 4 Day Week Campaign, said: "The decision by South Cambridgeshire District Council to outline plans to become the first ever UK local authority to trial a four-day week is historic and should be applauded." However, Anthony Browne, South Cambridgeshire MP, criticised the move, accusing the SCDC of "charging the taxpayer for the privilege".

The 4 days workweek was discussed in House of Lords on 5 September 2022 when Baroness Bennett of Manor Castle questioned if the government is considering the measure especially after Jacob Rees-Mogg announced a crack down on flexitime. Lord Callanan emphasised that government is assessing the measure. According to Peter Dowd, Labour MP for Bootle in Merseyside, cutting the number of hours worked each week to 32 would provide "every British worker the chance of moving to a four-day week." Dowd stated: "I am introducing this legislation because we're long overdue a shorter working week”. The bill to mandate 4 days workweek was debated in the House of Commons on October 18, 2022. Before it can become law, it must successfully pass through a number of phases.

Utah state government 

In 2008, employees of the Utah state government all began working ten-hour days from Monday to Thursday. 
By closing state government offices on Fridays, the state expected to save on operating costs such as electricity, heat, air conditioning, and gasoline for state-owned vehicles. Utah ended this practice however, in 2011, with the Utah Legislature overriding Governor Gary Herbert's veto of five-day work week legislation. Many local governments have had alternative schedules for many years.

K-12 public schools in the United States
Due to budgetary problems, public schools in Hawaii closed on 17 Fridays in 2010. In 2002, it was reported that over 100 school districts in rural areas in the United States have changed the school week to a four-day week; most also extended each school day by an hour or more. The changes were often made in order to save money on transportation, heating, and substitute teachers.

According to a 2021 study, which examined four-day school weeks in Oregon, the switch to four-day school weeks led to lower test scores in reading and math.

Higher education in the United States 
In January 2022, D'Youville College announced a transition to a 4 day, 32-hour work week for all staff and administration without any change to employees pay or benefits. The employees were previously working 37.5 hours per week. This initiative was a follow-up to a pilot program in 2020 which received positive feedback from employees. The program is described as a 6 month trial.

The Gambia civil service
In The Gambia, a four-day work week was introduced for public officials by president Yahya Jammeh, effective February 1, 2013. Working hours were limited to Monday through Thursday, 08:00 to 18:00, with Friday designated as a day of rest to allow residents more time for prayer and agriculture. This regulation was abolished in early 2017 by his successor, president Adama Barrow, who decreed a half-day of work on Fridays.

See also 

 Critique of work
 35-hour workweek
 Furlough
 Six-hour day
 Three-Day Week
 Working time
 Weekend
 Work–life interface

References

External links 

 4 Day Week Global Campaign
 4 Day Week U.S. Campaign
 4 Day Week UK Campaign with further research.

Human resource management
Working time
Labor rights